William B. Nulty, who was born on January 28, 1888, was an associate justice of the Supreme Judicial Court of Maine. Appointed a Maine Supreme Court justice by Maine Governor Frederick G. Payne (R) in 1949, McNulty died in office on September 11, 1953.

A graduate of Bowdoin College, McNulty subsequently attended Columbia Law School. Prior to being appointed to the Maine Supreme Court, Nulty served for 12 years as Assistant United States Attorney for the District of Maine and, then, later, as a Maine Superior Court Judge.

References

1888 births
1953 deaths
Justices of the Maine Supreme Judicial Court
Bowdoin College alumni
Columbia Law School alumni
20th-century American judges